RV Tangaroa is a research vessel operated by the National Institute of Water and Atmospheric Research (NIWA) of New Zealand. It was purpose-built as a Deepwater Research Vessel for the then Ministry of Agriculture and Fisheries Research Centre at a cost of $27 million to replace the ageing GRV James Cook. It was transferred to the new National Institute of Water and Atmospheric Research in 1992.

Tangaroa operates for 320 to 340 days per year conducting fisheries research in New Zealand's Exclusive Economic Zone and marine research in the waters surrounding Antarctica. It is equipped for hydrographic, bathymetric and oceanographic surveys to measure and map various properties of the ocean and seabed; biological surveys; and for both acoustic and trawl fisheries surveys.

In 2010 Tangaroa received a $20 million upgrade including a dynamic positioning system. This allows the ship to "automatically maintain a vessel in a fixed position at sea (within a few metres) by using its own propellers and thrusters". NIWA defended contracting the work to a Singapore dockyard to do the work instead of using the Devonport Naval Base Dockyard.

On one voyage in 2003, scientists aboard RV Tangaroa discovered over 500 species of fish and 1,300 species of invertebrate, and the tooth of an extinct megalodon.

In October–November 2016, a collaborative team of researchers on Tangaroa from Auckland Museum, University of Auckland, Massey University, NIWA and the Museum of New Zealand Te Papa Tongarewa undertook research around Kermadec Islands. The multi-disciplinary team investigated the biodiversity of organisms living on the ocean floor and at midwater.  The marine mammal populations were examined to determine what animal and plant species are shared between mainland New Zealand and the Kermadec region. Following the November 2016 Kaikōura earthquake, the ship was diverted to collect seafloor shallow cores between 14 and 19 November across and along the submarine Kaikoura Canyon.

Andrew Leachman served as the ship's first captain for more than twenty years, bringing the ship to New Zealand from Norway, and taking it as far north as New Caledonia and as far south as Antarctica.

See also
 HMNZS Manawanui - dive and hydrographic survey vessel

References

 RV Tangaroa: purpose-built deepwater research vessel, NIWA, 1995. 

Ships built in Bergen
Research vessels of New Zealand
1991 ships